The team eventing at the 1972 Summer Olympics took place between 29 August and 1 September. The event was open to men and women.

Competition format

The competition included three segments: dressage, cross-country, and show-jumping. Penalties from each were summed to give a total score. Teams consisted of four horse and rider pairs, though only the best three scores counted for the team total. If a team had fewer than three pairs finish, the team received no score.

Results

Final standings after jumping

References

Equestrian at the 1972 Summer Olympics